Apollon Paralimnio Football Club is a Greek football club based in Paralimnio, Serres.

History
The year 1970 was a milestone year for Apollon Paralimnio. In 1970, the idea of merging two groups began. By Digenis and Iraklis Paralimnio. On 14 April 1971, the sports club was officially founded under the name "Football Club of Paralimnio Apollon".

The purpose of the association as described in its statutes is the symmetrical and harmonious development of the physical and mental strength and skills of the members and the creation of strong and moral characters by using competition and football in combination with the implementation of an educational program for athletes.

After the change of the millennium, the successes of Apollon in terms of titles begin. The beginning is in the season 2000-01 with the conquest of the FCA Serres Cup. This is followed by an even more successful season, in 2001-2002, when they won the double of the local association, acquiring at the same time the right to participate in the Fourth National Division of Greece. They remained in the 4th National for five consecutive years until the 2005-2006 season. In the meantime, in 2004-05, they won the FCA Serres Cup again.

The team immediately enters a very difficult period in its history after not finding the appropriate interest from people to continue Apollon. The 2011-12 season begins with a new effort by young people with an appetite for work and a vision for the team. The necessary funds have been found to regenerate the team and make a fresh start with players who come from the lakeside, with the player-coach and president Keramaris Dimitris in front, along with a group of people determined to bring the team back to success while always keeping a low profile. He started his career by participating in the 3rd category of EPS SERRES and ascended to the A΄Category in two years. In the 2015-16 season, he manages to return to the National categories, facing Makedonikos, AO Kardia and Doxa Petrousas in the promotion barrages. In the periods 2012-13, 2014–15 and 2017–18, he becomes the cup winner of FCA Serres again. The year 2018 was, so far, the most successful in the history of the team, managing to win the championship of the first group of the Third National, participating in the promotion barrages for the promotion to the Second National, with opponents Iraklis, Volos and Tilikratis.

The 2019-20 season is the most historic season, with the team participating in the groups of the Greek Cup. In order to enter the groups, she had to exclude Feres (cup winner of FCA Evros) and Aiginiakos (Second National) in knockout matches. In the groups, he faced Trikala (Second National), Apollon Smyrnis (First National) and Asteras Tripolis (First National).

Players

Current squad

Honours

Domestic
 Serres FCA Champions: 3
 2001–02, 2014–15, 2015–16
 Serres FCA Cup Winners: 7
 2000–01, 2001–02, 2004–05, 2012–13, 2014–15, 2017–18, 2021–22

 
Football clubs in Central Macedonia
Gamma Ethniki clubs
Association football clubs established in 1970
1970 establishments in Greece